Tree, Swallows, Houses is an EP by the alternative rock band Maps & Atlases. It was released in 2007 on Sargent House.

Critical reception
The Chicago Tribune wrote that the album's "herky-jerky songs extend Chicago's noisy indie-rock tradition." Drowned in Sound called it "exhilarating," writing that it is full of "wheezing melodic splutters and elasticated yelps." The Aquarian wrote that it "settles into a continuously unwinding 'math rock' mosaic."

Track listing

References

Maps & Atlases albums
2007 EPs